The Outlaws is a 1950 Italian crime film directed by Aldo Vergano.

Plot 
Turi, having returned to Sicily from abroad, learns that his sister Maruzza is the lover of Cosimo Barrese, a militant of the Movement for the Independence of Sicily, who, abandoned by everyone, has become a bandit. The two would like to get married, but life as an outlaw seems an insurmountable obstacle. Turi asks for revenge on the bandit who has dishonored the family and uses a shady and devious lawyer to drive him into a trap.

Cast 
Vittorio Gassman: Turi
Maria Grazia Francia: Maruzza
Ermanno Randi: Cosimo
Umberto Spadaro: Don Ciccio 
Rocco D'Assunta: Don Agatino Santoro
Tino Buazzelli: Maresciallo Fulvio 
Virginia Balistrieri: Mother of Turi
Attilio Dottesio: Capitano dei carabinieri
Leonardo De Mitri: Baron Lo Curcio

References

External links

1950 films
Films directed by Aldo Vergano
Films scored by Carlo Rustichelli
Italian crime drama films
1950 crime drama films
Italian black-and-white films
1950s Italian films